Grady Hall is an American director of commercials and music videos, as well as a screenwriter, producer, and director of one-hour television series.

He has directed music videos for Beck, Katy Perry, and Capital Cities, for which he received a Grammy nomination, and won an MTV Video Music Award.

Career
Hall began his career working at Warner Bros. in syndicated television. He later became a development executive for television producer Douglas S. Cramer and was also a staff writer on The Outer Limits for SyFy, which filmed in Vancouver, British Columbia.

Hall was a founding director of the production company Motion Theory, which he helped build from a pure animation and design company into a live-action and visual effects studio. Filmmakers Guillermo del Toro and Guillermo Navarro co-founded Mirada as Motion Theory’s feature-film visual effects arm, with Hall taking a creative leadership role in the new company and simultaneously continuing to write and direct projects.

In 2010, Hall returned to TV, serving as a consulting producer and director for the debut season of Sam Raimi's Spartacus: Blood and Sand starring Lucy Lawless and Andy Whitfield.

In 2013, Hall's video for Capital Cities' “Safe and Sound” was nominated for two MTV Video Music Awards, winning for Best Visual Effects.  That same year, he also co-directed Katy Perry’s “Roar,” the most-watched video of the year and People’s Choice Award winner.

Hall left Motion Theory and Mirada in 2014 to join Partizan Entertainment, home to directors such as Michel Gondry, Antoine Bardou-Jacquet, and Michael Gracey. There, he worked on campaigns for Amazon, Pepsi, and Microsoft – directing the global launch video for the HoloLens augmented-reality viewer.

By 2016, Hall transitioned into the role of independent director, taking on a wider variety of creative projects through different production companies, agencies, and direct clients such as Intel, Honda, and Netflix.

Select music video credits
 “The Science of Selling Yourself Short” by Less Than Jake (2003)
 “Animal” by R.E.M. (2004)
 “Take It Away” by The Used (2004)
 “Getting Away with Murder” by Papa Roach (2004)
 “Girl” by Beck (2005)
 “Scars” by Papa Roach (2005)
 “Dashboard” by Modest Mouse (2007)
 “Safe and Sound” by Capital Cities (2013)
 “Roar” by Katy Perry (2013)
"Phoenix" by Olivia Holt (2016)
"Wow" by Beck (2016)

Awards

References

 Motion Theory in LA Weekly
 
GradyHall.com

American music video directors
American male screenwriters
Living people
Year of birth missing (living people)